Richard Gasquet was the defending champion, but lost in the final to Gaël Monfils, 4–6, 4–6.

Seeds
The top four seeds receive a bye into the second round.

 Richard Gasquet (final)
 Gilles Simon (second round)
 Jerzy Janowicz (semifinals)
 Dmitry Tursunov (second round)
 Gaël Monfils (champion)
 Jarkko Nieminen (semifinals)
 Édouard Roger-Vasselin (quarterfinals)
 Julien Benneteau (first round)

Draw

Finals

Top half

Bottom half

Qualifying

Seeds
 Marc Gicquel (qualified)
 Márton Fucsovics (second round)
 Marsel İlhan (qualified)
 Niels Desein (second round)
 Vincent Millot (qualifying competition, Lucky loser)
 Maxime Teixeira (qualifying competition)
 Austin Krajicek (qualifying competition)
 Grégoire Burquier (second round)

Qualifiers

Qualifying draw

First qualifier

Second qualifier

Third qualifier

Fourth qualifier

References
 Main draw
 Qualifying draw

Singles